Castleconnor GAA are a Gaelic Athletic Association club based in rural western County Sligo along the Sligo-Mayo border in Ireland. Castleconnor play in the Sligo Intermediate Championship and in Sligo League Division 2 and field underage football teams.

History

Castleconnor as a club have been in and out of the Sligo GAA history since 1889 but it is only since the 1970s that the club has been on a consistent footing. The club is the most westerly in county Sligo since 1896 when Queen Victoria adjusted the county boundary. This now means the parish is in both Sligo and Mayo counties, with players from the club representing both Sligo and Mayo. In fact during the 1950s the club played football in the summer months in Sligo and during the winter played in the North Mayo leagues. 

Whilst the club dissolved and was restarted during the years it was never extinct and produced players like Paddy Best a regular Sligo and Connacht player in the 1940s, the Mulderrig brothers who went on to win All Ireland titles with Mayo in 1950 and 51 after playing minor for Sligo, Barnes Murphy who led Sligo to Connacht glory in 1975 along with other county senior captains Paddy Joe Barrins & Kevin McDonnell, with past players having played intercounty for Louth, Cavan, Donegal, Longford and London. 

Prior to the 1940s many of the players in the parish played with neighbouring clubs. However in 1948 Michael Mulderrig, a native of Ballina, moved into the parish and as a seasoned Mayo county footballer he brought great interest to football again and the club was reformed for a number of years. However, when the Mulderrig's transferred back to Mayo the interest waned. In those days the club had no pitch and used Jones's/Langan's fields in Attychree for training and games. The club was again reformed again in 1955 by Liam Boland and Tom McMenamin and fielded a minor team and a Junior team, and while success evaded the team they did produce Christy Barrins who played on the Sligo Minor team. In 1959, following the emigration of 16 of the panel, the club ceased to exist again.

The last rejuvenation of the club was in 1969 and has seen the club going from strength to strength. The first honour ever won was the 1972 West Division Minor championship with a team featuring Gerry Barrins (who would captain a Mayo Vocational school to All Ireland glory) and Jimmy Cullen (who played for an amazing 4 years with the Sligo Minors). The club would go on to win adult championship titles in junior 1980 1985 2002 and intermediate title in 1998 and winning league titles in junior in 80,85, division 2 titles in 1990, 92, 98 and the senior league in 2006, the first adult county final played under floodlights in Sligo. In 2016 our club ground won the Sligo and Connacht titles of Club grounds of the year. In 1985 we won the best overall club in Scor na nOg in Sligo and achieved All Ireland success in the same event. In  2009 the club won our first underage A championship (u14 football) and went onto represent Sligo at Féile in Kildare.

In 2009 the club founded a hurling club which grew to compete in A championship underage finals. The Cawley brothers Tomás and Alan have both received Nicky Rackard All Star awards in the last number of years. This had its origins in the 1970 and 1980s when we had a Camogie club. Being to the forefront of ladies sport was shown again in the 1990s when Castleconnor ladies' club (now Eoghan Rua) was established. The club also has a very active handball club who regularly compete in Connacht and All Ireland competition.

The club is currently represented on the Sligo inter-county team by Sean Carrabine and David Carrabine also plays inter-county football for London.

Notable players
Seán Carrabine
Kevin McDonnell, Sligo senior captain at the age of 23

Roll of Honour
 Sligo Intermediate Football Championship:
 1998
 Sligo Junior Football Championship:
 1980, 1985, 2002
 Sligo Under-14 Football Championship:
 2009
 Sligo Superleague Championship:
 2004 (First Sligo county final under floodlights v Bunninadden)
 Sligo Senior Football League (Division 2):
 1990, 1992, 1998, 2004, 2018
 Sligo Junior Football League (Division 5):
1985
Sligo U21 B Championship:
2016, 2014
 Sligo U13 B Football Championship:
 2021
 Sligo U17 B Football League:
 2021

References

Gaelic games clubs in County Sligo